Oakleaf Plantation is a planned community in the Jacksonville area located mostly in unincorporated Clay County and partially within the Jacksonville city limits (Duval County). The Clay County portion is a census-designated place, with a 2010 population of 20,315. As of 2020, the population has risen to 28,153.

State Road 23 (First Coast Expressway), Jacksonville's future outer beltway, runs north-south through the center of OakLeaf Plantation. Argyle Forest Boulevard runs east to State Road 21 (Blanding Boulevard) in the Jacksonville neighborhood of Argyle Forest.

Oakleaf High School, Oakleaf Junior High School, Oakleaf Village Elementary School, Plantation Oaks Elementary School and Discovery Oaks Elementary School are located within the community, and are all part of the Clay County School District.

The U.S. Navy's Branan Field was formerly located in the east part of the community, centered on Oakleaf Village Elementary School.

References

External links
OakLeaf Plantation Resident Web Site (operated by the developer)

Neighborhoods in Jacksonville, Florida
Census-designated places in Florida
Census-designated places in Clay County, Florida
Planned communities in Florida
Westside, Jacksonville
Census-designated places in the Jacksonville metropolitan area